John Neilson Lake (19 August 1834 in Ernestown, Ontario, Canada – 12 February 1925) was originally a preacher for the Methodist Church in Canada and eventually selected the site that became the city of Saskatoon, Saskatchewan, Canada.  In 1881 Lake became the Commissioner of the Temperance Colonization Society of Toronto survey party that was formed to take advantage of a government land sale and established the colony.  In 1882 Lake chose the site that site for the settlement that would eventually become the city of Saskatoon. He is sometimes referred to as the "father of Saskatoon".

References

External links
 

1834 births
1925 deaths
People from Lennox and Addington County
Canadian Methodist ministers
People from Saskatoon